The Belfast Film Festival is Northern Ireland's largest film festival, attracting over 25,000 people annually. Since its founding in 1995, the festival has grown to include the Docs Ireland international documentary festival, as well as an Audience Development and Inclusion program. The festival also sponsors year-round film screenings around Belfast.

History

Founded in 1995 by writer Laurence McKeown, the festival began as a part of Féile an Phobail, and operated as the West Belfast Film Festival (WBFF) from 1995 to 2000. In its third and fourth year, WBFF ran as an independent event and included venues throughout the city. Under the stewardship of Michele Devlin and Laurence McKeown, it became the Belfast Film Festival in the year 2000 and ran as a citywide event, including venues in the North, South, East and West of Belfast.

At the 2004 event, the festival's offices in the Art Deco North Street Arcade were completely destroyed by fire. Despite losing their base and all their records, the festival recovered, relocated to Donegall St, and staged the event again the following year. The 2005 festival was launched by award-winning actor Stephen Rea.

The 2022 festival will see the launch of an International Competition for first or second features, with a total prize fund of £10,000 sponsored by a number of organisations, notably Yellow Moon, Greg Darby’s popular Northern post-production house. An international jury of filmmakers and industry professionals will award a prize of £7,000 to the director of the Best Film, alongside Jury Prizes for Outstanding Craft Contribution and Breakout Performance of £1,500 each.

Site-specific and Summer Programme

The inclusion of people and the fabric of the city in the programme is an important aspect of the BFF's work. In 2004 they hosted the first ever drive-in movie event in the city in Talbot St car park screening The Shining. They have screened films in used and disused swimming pools including Jaws and Session 9; on a boat in the River Lagan (Piranha); with live piano accompaniment in St Anne's Cathedral (16mm original version of The Hunchback of Notre Dame) and shown Carol Reed's Odd Man Out beside the Albert Clock, which featured heavily in the film. They have profiled unique architectural sites by hosting screenings inside the buildings, including the US political drama The West Wing at Parliament Buildings, Stormont, Oh, Mr Porter! at the Ulster Folk and Transport Museum, Cultra, The Warriors in a dystopian landscape beneath a city centre motorway flyover, and Stanley Kubrick's cult sci-fi epic 2001: A Space Odyssey in the historic dry dock in the city's old shipyards where the RMS Titanic last sat on dry ground.

Music has also featured strongly in their programming; some highlights include the collaborations with local talent such as Duke Special and David Holmes on audio visual performances, hosting the band Goblin to perform a live score to Dawn of the Dead, Cercueil (Coffin) the fantastic French duo performing to David Lynch's Eraserhead and a synchronised swim team (Aquabatix) performing live in a pool to alongside a compilation of aquatic and swim themed films and music.

Together with Belfast One, Belfast Film Festival runs the annual Summer Cinema at Belfast City Hall, featuring eight outdoor films across a July weekend.

The Belfast Film Festival Board & Team

Director: Michele Devlin

Programmer (International): Jessica Kiang

Programmer (UK and Ireland): Rose Baker

Programmer and Print Transport: Stuart Sloan

Head of Marketing: Mary Lindsay

Audience Development and Inclusion: Sara Morrison

Event Manager: Benen Dillon

Box Office Manager: Simeon Costello

Board of directors: Mark Cousins (Chair), Nisha Tandon, Lisa Barros D' Sa, Laurence McKeown, Louise O'Meara, Kevin Jackson & Lucy Baxter.

Patrons: Terry George, David Holmes, Pat Murphy, William Crawley and Stephen Rea.

Belfast Film Festival Award Winners

Short Film Competition

Maysles Brothers Documentary Competition (part of Docs Ireland international documentary festival since 2019)

Audience Award

Short Documentary Competition (part of Docs Ireland international documentary festival since 2019)

Réalta Award for Outstanding Contribution to Cinema

Lifetime Achievement Award

Sponsorship
Key funders are NI Department for Communities, Arts Council NI, Film Hub NI, Yellow Moon, British Council, Belfast City Council, Northern Ireland Screen and the British Film Institute.
 
2013: Peroni & Selective Travel

2014: Peroni & O2 International Sim

2015: O2 International Sim, DCAL and Tourism NI

2016: Peroni, Tourism NI and DCAL

2017: The Irish News, Tourism NI and Tourism Ireland

2018: Richer Sounds, Clayton Hotels

2021: Birra Moretti, Hastings Hotels

See also
Féile an Phobail
Cathedral Quarter Arts Festival
Queen's Film Theatre
Belfast Festival at Queen's

References

Film festivals in Northern Ireland
Festivals in Belfast
Spring (season) events in Northern Ireland